Army Black Knights basketball may refer to either of the basketball teams that represent the United States Military Academy:

Army Black Knights men's basketball
Army Black Knights women's basketball